The year 1711 in architecture involved some significant events.

Events
 Commission for Building Fifty New Churches set up in London under terms of the New Churches in London and Westminster Act (1710). Most of the nineteen churches it eventually builds or rebuilds will be designed by Nicholas Hawksmoor, with John James, Thomas Archer and James Gibbs also participating.

Buildings and structures

Buildings

 Marlborough House in London, designed by Christopher Wren, is completed.
 Menshikov Palace (Saint Petersburg) is opened.
 Pope Clement XI places an Egyptian obelisk in the fountain in front of the Pantheon, Rome.

Births
 September 22 – Thomas Wright, English astronomer, mathematician and garden designer (died 1786)

Deaths
 Henry Bell, English architect (born 1647)

References

architecture
Years in architecture
18th-century architecture